The Capt. John H. Ozmon Store is a historic general store located at Centreville, Queen Anne's County, Maryland.  It is a two-story brick building constructed about 1880 into the side of a steep bank, with the store occupying the lower story and a dwelling on the second floor. Captain Ozmon was a prominent local merchant who built a considerable business transporting grain, lumber, and other merchandise by sailing schooner between Baltimore, Norfolk, and points on the Eastern Shore of the Chesapeake Bay.

It was listed on the National Register of Historic Places in 1985.

References

External links
, including photo from 1978, at Maryland Historical Trust

Buildings and structures in Queen Anne's County, Maryland
Commercial buildings on the National Register of Historic Places in Maryland
Commercial buildings completed in 1880
1880 establishments in Maryland
National Register of Historic Places in Queen Anne's County, Maryland